Atlan Anien (January 17, 1920 – 1992) was a speaker of the Legislature of the Marshall Islands.

Biography
Anien began his education at the US Navy Interpreter School and subsequently went to Goshen College and then the University of Hawaii.

Anien taught elementary schools for 7 years and later was appointed Superintendent of Elementary Education in the Marshall Islands.

Anien was elected Secretary of the Marshall Islands and was a framer of the Constitution. Later, he was elected as Speaker of the Legislature in 1979 and served until 1987.

Anien was married and had 4 children.

References

1920 births
1992 deaths
Members of the Congress of the Trust Territory of the Pacific Islands
Marshallese politicians
Speakers of the Legislature of the Marshall Islands
Marshallese expatriates in the United States
University of Hawaiʻi at Mānoa alumni